Pnictogen hydrides or hydrogen pnictides are binary compounds of hydrogen with pnictogen ( or ; from  "to choke" and -gen, "generator") atoms (elements of group 15: nitrogen, phosphorus, arsenic, antimony, and bismuth) covalently bonded to hydrogen.

Pnictogen trihydrides
The simplest series has the chemical formula XH3 (less commonly H3X), with X representing any of the pnictogens. They take on the pyramidal structure (as opposed to the trigonal planar arrangement of the group 13 hydrides), and therefore are polar. These pnictogen trihydrides are generally increasingly unstable and poisonous with heavier elements.

Some properties of the pnictogen trihydrides follow:

These gases have no smell in pure form, instead gaining it when in contact with air. Ammonia has an infamous, intense odour resembling urine and/or fish, commonly the result of the decomposition of urea. Phosphine smells like fish or garlic, and stibine like rotten eggs, similar to hydrogen sulfide and selenide.

Dipnictogen tetrahydrides

Higher derivatives
Polyphosphanes exist with the formula PnHn+2 (n = 1–9).  Linear and branch isomers of  have been detected. Other cyclic and condensed polyphosphane series are known, from PnHn to PnHn−18, amounting to 85 known phosphanes in 1997.

Properties 
Noncyclic hydrogen pnictides follow the formula XnHn+2.

Insoluble in water but soluble in organic liquids (as well as carbon disulfide and trichloroacetic acid), phosphine is a reducing agent.

Ammonia is produced industrially on the largest scale among all compounds. Like water, hydrogen bonding results in a high melting and boiling point compared to the other pnictogen hydrides, although 26% is lost on melting, another 7% as the liquid is heated to boiling, and the remaining 67% upon boiling. Other effects of hydrogen bonding are a high dielectric constant as well as low values of density, viscosity, and electrical conductivity. Like water, it is an excellent and often-used ionising solvent. Over twenty other hydrides of nitrogen are known, the most important being hydrazine (N2H4) and hydrogen azide (HN3). Hydrazine has physical properties that are remarkably similar to those of water: its melting and boiling points are 2.0 °C and 113.5 °C, the density of the solid at −5 °C is 1.146 g/cm3, while that of the liquid at 25 °C is 1.00 g/cm3. The azanes are a series which include ammonia, hydrazine and triazane.

Phosphine, a toxic, colourless gas, is the most stable phosphorus hydride

Arsine, stibine, and bismuthine are highly toxic, thermally unstable, and colourless gases. The pnictogen hydrides become denser down the group and the M–H bond lengths increase, while the H–M–H bond angle decreases slightly. The standard enthalpies of formation reflect the increasing thermal instability going down the group. Arsine decomposes to arsenic and hydrogen at 250–300 °C, stibine to antimony and hydrogen at room temperature, and bismuthine to bismuth and hydrogen above −45 °C. Arsine and stibine are very easily oxidised to arsenic or antimony trioxide and water; a similar reaction happens with sulfur or selenium. Reaction with metals at elevated temperatures leads to arsenides and antimonides. A few lower hydrides are known, such as As2H4, but they are even more unstable and their properties are unknown.

Imidogen, a radical composed of one hydrogen atom and one nitrogen atom (NH), can be classed as a pnictogen hydride.

See also 
Ammonium
Hydrazoic acid

References

Bibliography

Hydrogen compounds
Hydrides